Andratamarina is a town and commune in northern Madagascar. It belongs to the district of Sambava, which is a part of Sava Region. The population of the commune was estimated to be approximately 8,000 in 2001 commune census.

Only primary schooling is available in town. The majority 95% of the population in the commune are farmers.  The most important crop is vanilla, while other important products are coffee and rice.  Services provide employment for 5% of the population.

References and notes 

Populated places in Sava Region